Cyphagoginae is a subfamily of primitive weevils in the family of beetles known as Brentidae. There are at least 70 genera and 420 described species in Cyphagoginae. Cyphagoginae is sometimes treated as the tribe Cyphagogini rather than a subfamily, according to Oberprieler, 2007.

Genera
These 79 genera belong to the subfamily Cyphagoginae:

 Adidactus Senna, 1894 i c g
 Afrodermus Mantilleri, 2005 i c g
 Allaeometrus Senna, 1903 i c g
 Allagogus Gahan, 1909 i c g
 Amobaeus Kleine, 1925 i c g
 Amphithetobrentus Damoiseau, 1963 i c g
 Anaraiorrhinus Damoiseau, 1987 i c g
 Ancylobrentus Damoiseau, 1965 i c g
 Atopobrentus Damoiseau, 1965 i c g
 Autometrus Kleine, 1922 i c g
 Autosebus Kolbe, 1916 i c g
 Azemius Damoiseau, 1961 i c g
 Basenius Kolbe, 1892 i c g
 Caenosebus Kleine, 1916 i c g
 Callipareius Senna, 1892 i c g
 Calodromus Guérin-Méneville, 1832 i c g
 Catagogus Kleine, 1926 i c g
 Ceragogus Kleine, 1925 i c g
 Cerobates Schoenherr, 1840 i c g
 Chelorhinus Kleine, 1922 i c g
 Cormopus Kolbe, 1892 i c g
 Cyphagogus Parry, 1849 i c g
 Dentisebus De Muizon, 1960 i c g
 Diastrophocoleps Damoiseau, 1967 i c g
 Dyscheromorphus Kleine, 1916 i c g
 Ecnomobrentus Damoiseau, 1965 i c g
 Eterozemus Senna, 1903 i c g
 Eurorhinus Damoiseau, 1961 i c g
 Genogogus Kleine, 1925 i c g
 Hoplopisthius Senna, 1892 i c g
 Hyperephanus Senna, 1892 i c g
 Isomorphus Kleine, 1916 i c g
 Macropareia Kleine, 1932 i c g
 Megalosebus Kolbe, 1916 i c g
 Mesoderes Senna, 1898 i c g
 Metusambius Kolbe, 1916 i c g
 Microsebus Kolbe, 1892 i c g
 Nannobrenthus Kolbe, 1916 i c g
 Neoceocephalus Senna, 1898 i c g
 Neocyphagogus Damoiseau, 1979 i c g
 Neosebus Senna, 1903 i c g
 Neoxybasius Kolbe, 1916 i c g
 Neozemioses Damoiseau, 1989 i c g
 Nesidiobrentus Damoiseau, 1964 i c g
 Odontopareius Damoiseau, 1964 i c g
 Oncodemerus Senna, 1892 i c g
 Opisthenoxys Kleine, 1922 i c g
 Opisthozemius Kolbe, 1916 i c g
 Palaeoparagogus Damoiseau, 1979 i c g
 Paraclidorhinus Senna, 1903 i c g
 Paradidactus Quentin, 1966 i c g
 Paragogus Kleine, 1926 i c g
 Paramicrosebus Damoiseau, 1962 i c g
 Parasebaius De Muizon, 1955 i
 Parusambius Kleine, 1925 i c g
 Pittodes Kleine, 1922 i c g
 Podozemius Kolbe, 1916 i c g
 Protoproctus Kolbe, 1916 i c g
 Protusambius Kolbe, 1916 i c g
 Pseudamobaeus Damoiseau, 1967 i c g
 Pseudanchisteus Kleine, 1922 i c g
 Pseudoadidactus De Muizon, 1955 i c g
 Pseudocyphagonus Desbrochers des Loges, 1890 i c g
 Pseudoparagogus De Muizon, 1955 i c g
 Pseudousambius De Muizon, 1955 i c g
 Schizoadidactus Kleine, 1916 i c g
 Sebasius Lacordaire, 1865 i c g
 Stereobates Sharp, 1895 i c g
 Stereobatinus Kleine, 1927 i c g
 Stereodermus Lacordaire, 1865 i c g b
 Stibacephalus Kleine, 1916 i c g
 Synsebasius Kolbe, 1916 i c g
 Tetanocephalus Kleine, 1916 i c g
 Usambioproctus Kolbe, 1916 i c g
 Usambius Kolbe, 1892 i c g
 Vietobrentus Kabakov, 2001 i c g
 Xenadidactus Damoiseau, 1979 i c g
 Xestothorax Damoiseau, 1989 i c g
 Zemioses Pascoe, 1862 i c g

Data sources: i = ITIS, c = Catalogue of Life, g = GBIF, b = Bugguide.net

References

Further reading

External links

Brentidae
Articles created by Qbugbot